Yahukimo Regency is one of the regencies (kabupaten) in the Indonesian province of Highland Papua. It covers an area of 17,152 km2, and had a population of 164,512 at the 2010 Census, but this figure more than doubled to reach 350,880 at the 2020 Census; the official estimate as at mid 2021 was 355,746. The administrative centre is the town of Dekai. The regency was once part of the Jayawijaya Regency, but was split off in 2002.

Several famines have affected Yahukimo Regency. In 2005, around 60 people died and at least 117 fell seriously ill after a food shortage. Another 113 people died from a famine caused by a failed harvest in 2009, but the regional government denied that the food shortage was a "famine".

Etymology
The name Yahukimo is a combined word from the names of the tribes living in the area, the Yali, Hubla, Kimyal and Momuna.

Administrative Districts
The existing Yahukimo regency comprises fifty-one districts (distrik), tabulated below with their areas and their populations at the 2010 Census and the 2020 Census. The regency has a greater number of districts within it than any other regency in Indonesia; however, proposals are currently under consideration by the Indonesian government to divide Yahukimo Regency into several new regencies. The table also includes the number of administrative villages (rural desa and urban kelurahan in each district, and its postal code. Each district bears the same name as its administrative centre, except for Kurima District, of which Obalma is the administrative centre.

References

External links
Statistics publications from Statistics Indonesia (BPS)

Regencies of Highland Papua